Blanchard Township may refer to:

 Blanchard Township, Hancock County, Ohio
 Blanchard Township, Hardin County, Ohio
 Blanchard Township, Putnam County, Ohio

Township name disambiguation pages